Alexander "Sandy" Nuttgens (born 1964), is a British composer and a member of the British Academy of Composers and Songwriters.

He is principally known for scoring television programmes mainly in the realm of children's TV and documentaries. He has scored numerous BAFTA and Royal Television Society winners and nominees including My Parents Are Aliens for Granada, Timelines for October Films and Shakespeare Shorts for the BBC. In 2008 he scored his first feature film 'The Blue Tower'which won Best UK Film at the London Raindance Film Festival.

In children's television he scored the music for series 2 of Postman Pat SDS for Classic Media, and Big & Small, Get Well Soon and Dinopaws for Kindle Entertainment. Both Postman Pat and Dinopaws were nominated in the 2014 BAFTA Children's Awards.

In 2007 Nuttgens won an RTS Yorkshire Region Award for Best Music for his score for Terry Jones' Barbarians for Oxford Films and the BBC. He was nominated for RTS Best Music for 'The Rise and Fall of Tony Blair' for Channel4 in 2008, and in 2010 he won an RTS Award for Best Music for 'The Queen in 3D' for Renegade Films.

Nuttgens has a long-term relationship as principal composer for Yorkshire's national touring young peoples theatre company, Pilot Theatre . Their break-through production of Lord of the Flies was nominated for a TMA Award in 1999 and won a Manchester Evening News Award for best production in 2001. Recent productions have included the stage premiere of Anne Cassidy's Looking For JJ and providing the opening show for the 2007 International Indian Film Academy film awards. In 2010 he scored Pilot's much acclaimed touring version of Romeo and Juliet, and co-wrote the title song 'Kiss By The Book' with Molly McQueen, daughter of Midge Ure.

Nuttgens was a founder member of UK dance act Skipraiders, which was signed to Paul Oakenfold and his Perfecto Records label. He also has a long-term writing collaboration with UK Garage and reggae singer Sweetie Irie.

In 2004 Nuttgens led the campaign to establish the first Parent Promoted secondary school in the UK culminating in the opening of The Elmgreen School in 2007. He was the school's first Chair of Governors and Chair of the Parent Promoters Foundation.

Nuttgens is the son of academic and architect Patrick Nuttgens and the grandson of stained glass artist Joseph Edward Nuttgens. He is married to Actress and Voice-Over artist Claire Lacey and has three children.

References

External links
 
 The official Sandy Nuttgens website - nuttgens.com
 /: BBC story on Sandy Nuttgens - bbc.co.uk

1964 births
Living people
British composers